Dashwood (original name Friedsburg) is a small, primarily residential, community in southwestern Ontario, Canada. The former police village is located at the intersection of Bronson Line and Dashwood Road, on the boundary between the Municipality of Bluewater and the Municipality of South Huron. The community is situated approximately 50 kilometers north west of London near the resort village of Grand Bend, which is located on the south east coast of Lake Huron.

History
Dashwood began when the brothers Noah and Absalom Fried formerly of Blenheim Township in Oxford County, resettled in the area in 1853. They first erected a saw mill, followed shortly by a grain mill, on the site of the future community serving the needs of the influx of mainly European settlers brought about by the local development of Canada Company lands earlier in the century. A change of circumstances brought about an alteration of the plans of the two brothers and lower cost land became available at the current site of the community. The name of the community changed from Friedsburg to Dashwood in December 1871, when a post office was opened, Noah Fried became the first postmaster. Although the subject of some debate Dashwood was likely named after Dashwood House, in London England, the headquarters in Britain of the once regionally important Grand Trunk Railway. Peak economic activity occurred in Dashwood in the early to mid 20th century and at its height included a number of mills, hotels, general stores, a regionally large scale window manufacturing company and an assortment of shops and services geared to its rural surroundings.

References

External links 

Communities in Huron County, Ontario